Székely may refer to:
 
Székelys, Hungarian people from the historical region of Transylvania, Romania
Székely Land, historic and ethnographic area in Transylvania, Romania
Székely (village), a village in northeastern Hungary
Székely (surname)
Szekely Aircraft Engine
 György Dózsa, also referred to as György Székely

See also
 Secuieni (disambiguation) (a term linked to the Székelys in Romanian)